Road 14 is a road in Iranian Azerbaijan connecting Ardabil to Ahar, Tabriz, Shabestar and Salmas. Part of the road 14 paths from North of Tabriz where it merges into Pasdaran Highway.

References

External links 

 Iran road map on Young Journalists Club

Roads in Iran